Joseph Adam Sevario III (born September 18, 1944) is an American politician. He served as a Democratic member for the 18th district of the Louisiana State Senate.

Sevario was the son of Joseph Adam Sevario Jr. and Audrey Cannon. He had two brothers and three sisters. In 1976, Sevario was elected for the 18th district of the Louisiana State Senate, serving until 1994. In 1986 he was a candidate for the 8th congressional district of Louisiana of the United States House of Representatives, but was not elected.

Louisiana Highway 932 has been named Joe Sevario Road.

References 

1944 births
Living people
Place of birth missing (living people)
Democratic Party Louisiana state senators
20th-century American politicians
American people of Italian descent
Businesspeople from Louisiana